Merry Clayton (born December 25, 1948) is an American soul and gospel singer. She provided a number of backing vocal tracks for major performing artists in the 1960s, most notably on the Rolling Stones song "Gimme Shelter". Clayton is prominently featured in 20 Feet from Stardom, the Oscar-winning documentary about background singers and their contributions to the music industry.

Early life 
Clayton was born in Gert Town, New Orleans, Louisiana. She was born on Christmas Day, and was given the name "Merry" because of the December 25th birthdate. She is the daughter of Eva B. Clayton and Reverend A.G. Williams, Sr.

Clayton was raised in New Orleans as a Christian, and spent much of her time in her father’s parish, New Zion Baptist Church. After moving to Los Angeles, she met members of The Blossoms, who convinced her to pursue a music career.

Career 
Throughout her career as a backup singer, Clayton's singing can be heard on songs by Pearl Bailey, Phil Ochs, Burt Bacharach, Tom Jones, Joe Cocker, Linda Ronstadt, Carole King, and on several tracks from Neil Young's debut album. Clayton is often credited as having recorded with Elvis Presley but her name does not appear in Elvis sessionographies.

Clayton has been sampled in various songs, most notably "Watch for the Hook" by Cool Breeze featuring Goodie Mob, and supergroup Outkast.

1960s
Clayton began her recording career in 1962, at the age of 14. She first sang on "Who Can I Count On?" as a duet with Bobby Darin, on his album You're the Reason I'm Living.

In 1963, she recorded the first-released version of "The Shoop Shoop Song (It's in His Kiss)", the same year that Betty Everett's version reached the Top 10 on the Billboard Hot 100. Early in her career, Clayton performed with Ray Charles (as one of the Raelettes). At the time, Charles was the only artist her father would allow her to see at a live performance.

Clayton is best known for her 1969 duet with Mick Jagger on the Rolling Stones song "Gimme Shelter" (though on some releases her name is misspelled as "Mary"). According to Jagger, the collaboration happened partially by chance: Jagger stated that the band thought, "it'd be great to have a woman come do the… chorus." They called Clayton "randomly" in the middle of the night in Los Angeles, and she showed up to the studio "in curlers" and contributed her parts in a few takes, which Jagger remarked was "pretty amazing." Clayton performed her parts while pregnant, soon afterward suffering a miscarriage. Clayton was actually the band's second choice for the part; The Stones had asked Bonnie Bramlett to sing on the song, but Bramlett's husband Delaney refused to let her perform with the Stones.

1970s
In 1970, Clayton recorded her own version of "Gimme Shelter", and it became the title track of her debut solo album, released that year. Her solo version peaked at No. 73 on the pop charts. Her version would be the first of five singles under her name to crack the Billboard Hot 100. That same year, she performed a live version of "Lift Every Voice and Sing" for the soundtrack for the Robert Altman film, Brewster McCloud, and also contributed vocals to Donald Cammell and Nicolas Roeg's film, Performance.

In 1971, she co-wrote the song "Sho' Nuff" about her mother.

In 1972, she starred as the original Acid Queen in the first London production of The Who's Tommy.

In 1973, she featured prominently on Ringo Starr's "Oh My My", which reached Billboard's Top 10 the following year.
Along with her frequent partner Clydie King, Clayton also sang backing vocals on Lynyrd Skynyrd's "Sweet Home Alabama".

In the mid-1970s Clayton sang on The Blackbyrds' R&B hit "Rock Creek Park", and continued to release solo albums throughout the next decade, notching several minor R&B chart singles.

1980s
Her soundtrack work continued into the 1980s, including "You're Always There When I Need You", the title track for the 1980 Get Smart film, The Nude Bomb, and the song "Yes" from Dirty Dancing, which hit No. 45 on the Hot 100.

In the mid-1980s, Clayton was in the gospel group Brilliance, formed by Della Reese. The other members were O.C. Smith, Vermettya Royster, and Eric Strom. They released an album on Atlanta International Records in 1986.

In 1987, Clayton co-starred with Ally Sheedy in the film Maid to Order. That same year, Clayton also played the character "Verna Dee Jordan" in the final season of Cagney & Lacey.

In 1989, Clayton recorded a cover version of "Almost Paradise" with Eric Carmen.

1990s and later years
In 1994, Clayton sang on backing vocals and also the "Man with the Golden Gun" bridge for Tori Amos's hit, "Cornflake Girl".

In 2006, Clayton provided background vocals for Sparta's album Threes, on the songs "Atlas" and "Translations".

In 2013, she released The Best of Merry Clayton, a compilation of her favorite songs.

Clayton was featured in the documentary film 20 Feet from Stardom (2013), which premiered at the Sundance Film Festival, and went on to win the Oscar for best documentary at the 86th Academy Awards. 20 Feet from Stardom also won the 2015 Grammy Award for Best Music Film, with the award being presented to the featured artists, in addition to the production crew for the film.

In 2014, Clayton provided vocals for G. Love & Special Sauce's album Sugar.

In 2015, Clayton was featured on two tracks of Coldplay's album A Head Full of Dreams.

In 2021, her solo album Beautiful Scars was released.

Personal life
Clayton was married to jazz artist Curtis Amy from 1970 until his death in 2002. Their son, Kevin Amy, has also pursued a musical career. Her brother is Little Feat percussionist Sam Clayton.

Clayton had a miscarriage upon returning home from recording "Gimme Shelter", according to the Los Angeles Times.

On June 16, 2014, Clayton was critically injured in a car collision in Los Angeles, California that caused both of her legs to be  amputated at the knees due to her suffering "profound trauma to her lower extremities."

Discography

Studio albums

Compilation albums

Singles (selected)

Filmography

References

External links

 
 
Merry Clayton fansite with brief biography, full discography, full released guest appearances, all with music streaming links, filmography, gigography, videos, pictures, articles, links etc.

1948 births
20th-century African-American women singers
American gospel singers
American soul singers
20th-century American singers
21st-century American singers
MCA Records artists
Motown artists
Ode Records artists
Grammy Award winners
Living people
American amputees
Rhythm and blues musicians from New Orleans
Singers from Louisiana
20th-century American women singers
21st-century American women singers
21st-century African-American women singers
The Raelettes members
Women who experienced pregnancy loss